Jeson Patrombon (born March 27, 1993) is a Filipino tennis player.

On the junior tour, Patrombon had a career high junior ranking of 9 achieved in January 2011. He reached the quarterfinals of the 2011 Australian Open boys' singles event.

Patrombon has a career high ATP singles ranking of 869 achieved on August 13, 2012. He also has a career high ATP doubles ranking of 1063 achieved on October 5, 2015. Patrombon has won 1 ITF doubles title.

Patrombon has represented Philippines at the Davis Cup where he has a W/L record of 5–4.

References

External links
 
 
 

1993 births
Living people
Filipino male tennis players
People from Iligan
Sportspeople from Lanao del Norte
Tennis players at the 2010 Summer Youth Olympics
Southeast Asian Games silver medalists for the Philippines
Southeast Asian Games bronze medalists for the Philippines
Southeast Asian Games medalists in tennis
Tennis players at the 2018 Asian Games
Competitors at the 2017 Southeast Asian Games
Asian Games competitors for the Philippines
Competitors at the 2011 Southeast Asian Games
Southeast Asian Games gold medalists for the Philippines
Competitors at the 2019 Southeast Asian Games
Competitors at the 2015 Southeast Asian Games
Competitors at the 2021 Southeast Asian Games
21st-century Filipino people